Anacasta is a genus of longhorn beetles of the subfamily Lamiinae, containing the following species:

 Anacasta biplagiata Breuning, 1940
 Anacasta conspersa Aurivillius, 1916

References

Desmiphorini
Cerambycidae genera